The New Zealand Criminal Cases Review Commission (branded as Te Kāhui Tātari Ture | Criminal Cases Review Commission) is an independent Crown entity  that was set up under the Criminal Cases Review Commission Act 2019 to investigate potential miscarriages of justice. The Commission came into being on 1 July 2020. The CCRC replaces the Royal Prerogative of Mercy (RPM) whereby the Governor-General, following a review of the case by the Ministry of Justice, could pardon the defendant or recommend the Appeal Court reconsider the case. 

The need for an independent commission arose because of a growing number of high profile miscarriages of justice in New Zealand and concerns that the Ministry of Justice is not independent of the Crown or the judiciary – with the result that the granting of pardons by the Governor-General has been extremely rare in New Zealand. The last person to receive such a pardon was  Arthur Allan Thomas in 1979. Since 1995, only 15 cases out of 166 applications for the RPM were sent back to the courts for further consideration.

The commission is based in Hamilton in order to increase its independence from the Crown and government agencies in Wellington and Auckland. It is governed by a board of appointed commissioners. It employs specialist staff with the mandate to investigate possible miscarriages of justice, but does not decide innocence or guilt. If the commission considers a miscarriage of justice may have occurred, it can refer the case back to the courts to be reconsidered.

Background 
In 2006, Sir Thomas Thorp, a retired High Court judge said there might 20 or more innocent people in prison in New Zealand, although no data exists describing how many unaddressed miscarriages have actually occurred.  There is also no documented information describing the nature of the inquiry process used by the Ministry of Justice when considering applications for a pardon.  Historically, the applicant had to provide the necessary information and make their case for the exercise of the prerogative of mercy. The Ministry would review the information but had no power to actually investigative what happened. This means that well-resourced applicants with access to professional assistance had a distinct advantage over those without such resources. 

Another concern is that historically, the Royal prerogative of mercy process has received very few applications from Māori and Pacific people, who are over-represented in the justice system. Between 11 and 16 per cent of applications have been from Māori and Pacific peoples even though they make up more than 60 per cent of the prison population. New Zealand has needed a Criminal Cases Review Commission for people of all ethnicities and backgrounds.

Even for Europeans, the process has been arduous. Arthur Allan Thomas was  one of the first that received significant media attention. Convicted of murder, he received a pardon in 1980 after a Royal Commission inquiry into his case found the police had planted evidence in order to secure his conviction. David Bain spent 13 years in prison before his conviction was overturned by the Privy Council in London after a lengthy legal battle conducted on his behalf by former All Black, Joe Karam. 

Teina Pora spent 20 years in prison for a murder he did not commit, before his conviction was overturned. A more recent case is that of Alan Hall. It took 36 years, 19 of them spent in prison, before the Supreme Court of New Zealand acknowledged a substantial miscarriage of justice had occurred and overturned his conviction on 8 June 2022. Both Teina Pora and Alan Hall were subsequently diagnosed with autism which made them vulnerable to manipulation when interrogated by police.

Another possible case includes Shaun Allen, who was convicted of growing cannabis on his farm and has been battling for 29 years to clear his name. His farm was confiscated and he spent 18 months in prison. Others likely to make an application include Mark Lundy and Scott Watson both of whom have protested their innocence despite spending years in prison.

The need for a Commission also stems from concerns about the lack of independence of the previous review process, the length of time it takes for investigations to be conducted, the reluctance of appeal courts to overturn convictions and the poor quality of investigations into miscarriages of justice. Former Justice Minister, Andrew Little, was instrumental in establishing the CCRC. In February 2020, he announced it would be established in Hamilton, adding that: "we've have some significant cases where there have been miscarriages of justice and it has taken a long time for that to be detected, for things to be put right, and ultimately for justice to be done".

Judicial reluctance to overturn convictions 

The years of legal wrangling that David Bain endured before his conviction was finally overturned after 13 years became the subject of intense media interest in New Zealand. With Joe Karam's help, he made his first application to the New Zealand Court of Appeal in 1995. In June 1998, he petitioned the Governor-General for a pardon. His case was reviewed by the Ministry of Justice, and sent back to the Court of Appeal which again turned him down. In March 2007, Bain took his case to the Privy Council in London. The Privy Council quashed his convictions and ordered a retrial. It was not until 2009 that a new trial was held and he was finally found not guilty. Judith Collins, who was Minister of Justice at the time, refused to accept that he was innocent and denied him Government compensation, even though he spent 13 years in prison. 

Until 2022, the New Zealand justice system had also repeatedly turned a blind eye to Alan Hall's imprisonment, despite extensive documentation provided to the Ministry of Justice describing what had gone wrong with his case. Nick Chisnall, the lawyer who helped persuade the Supreme Court overturn Alan Hall's conviction, commented afterwards:  "the fact it’s taken 30 years to get to this point, is an indictment on our criminal justice system. It demonstrates how hard a palpably innocent person has to work to overturn a conviction.”

Powers 
The commission has the power to develop its own procedures to ensure it can effectively carry out its duties and functions. In addition to its power of referral, the Commission has a duty to educate people and promote its work; the power to make initial inquires on its own-motion; a power to conduct thematic inquiries; and the power to obtain information or exhibits from any public and private bodies it deems relevant to an inquiry.

Personnel 
Colin Carruthers QC has been appointed as the Chief Commissioner. Paula Rose is the deputy chief commissioner. Rose is a former Police national manager of road policing.  The other commissioners are Nigel Hampton CNZM OBE QC, Dr Virginia Hope MNZM, Professor Tracey McIntosh MNZM, Kingi Snelgar, and Associate Professor Tamasailau Suaalii-Sauni.

Tim McKinnell is the CCRC’s investigation and review manager. He is also a former police officer who became an independent investigator, and played a key role in overturning the murder convictions of Teina Pora and Alan Hall.

Application process 
Applicants must have been convicted of a criminal offence in New Zealand and still be alive (which rules out Peter Ellis (childcare worker) making an application). Applications can also be made by family members, lawyers or support people on behalf of the applicant. Applicants need to have exhausted all their rights of appeal at court before making an application.  The CCRC will request information from the lawyers or advocates who supported the convicted person at every stage of the process including details of any confidential discussions the Applicant had with their lawyer or advocate.

Number of applications 
The Ministry of Justice assumed the number of applications would increase to 125 a year from only 8 per year, with perhaps 38 applications leading to full investigations. 
Instead, it received 200 applications in the first 10 months, compared with less than 170 for a Royal Prerogative of Mercy in the previous 23 years.  

Since the Commission launched in July 2000, a total of 308 applications were made from individuals claiming they have been wrongly convicted or sentenced (as at June 2022). The Commission has received applications involving a broad range of offences including homicides, sexual offences, serious and complex fraud and less serious offences. Forty-seven applications related to murder or manslaughter convictions. 129 cases, or 46 per cent, involved convictions for sexual offences – 70 against adults and 59 against minors. Other applications are related to convictions for violent offending (14 per cent), dishonesty and fraud (9 per cent), and drugs (8 per cent).

More than a third of the applications relate to convictions that occurred in the last five years. However, 23 of the applications are for cases that are more than 21 years old. Nearly 75% of applications are from current prison inmates, but nearly a quarter are for individuals in the community who have historical convictions they’re still contesting.

191 cases are still at the initial stages of the investigative process and, so far, only 12 cases have led to a full investigation by the Commission.

References

External links 

 

New Zealand independent crown entities
2020 establishments in New Zealand